The Andrieskerk ("St. Andrew's church") is a nowadays Protestant church in the Dutch village of Amerongen. The church's history spans around seven centuries, beginning in the end of the 13th century, when everybody in western Europe had to be Roman Catholic. With the Reformation, the church became Protestant in 1582. It is currently used by the Reformed Municipal Parish of Amerongen.

References

External links
  (in Dutch).

Churches in Utrecht (province)
Protestant churches in the Netherlands
Utrechtse Heuvelrug
Protestant churches converted from Roman Catholicism